Charles F. Carpenter was President of the Tri-State League in baseball from 1906 to 1913. He was forced into retirement in 1913 by the club owners.

References

Baseball executives
Year of birth missing
Year of death missing